Chenaruiyeh (also Romanized as Chenārū’īyeh and Chenārrū’īyeh) is a village in Horjand Rural District, Kuhsaran District, Ravar County, Kerman Province, Iran. At the 2006 census, its population was 43, in 11 families.

References 

Populated places in Ravar County